Lipotriches pulchriventris is a species of bee in the genus Lipotriches, of the family Halictidae. It is widespread in Southeast Asia and variable in appearance, and has been given numerous names since its original description.

References

External links
 ITIS Standard Report Page: Lipotriches pulchriventris
 ADW: Lipotriches pulchriventris: CLASSIFICATION
 Lipotriches pulchriventris (Cameron, 1897)
 Lipotriches pulchriventris | halictidae

Halictidae
Insects described in 1897